Passage is a 2009 American-Swiss drama short film, the first to be directed by Shekhar Kapur, starring Haley Bennett, Lily Cole and Julia Stiles.

Premise
Three estranged sisters reunite one night when the oldest comes back for her two younger sisters after leaving them years before in mysterious circumstances.

Cast
 Haley Bennett as Abby
 Lily Cole as Tania
 Julia Stiles as Ella
 Agustina Cabo as little Tania
 Pilar Calviello as little Ella
 Maite Lanata as little Abby
 Tomas Decurgez as Abby's boyfriend
 Ricardo Merkin as conductor
 Vikram Chatwal as man in bar

Production
The music for Passage was composed by A.R. Rahman, and the project was shot in Buenos Aires, Federal District, Argentina. The film was financed by the Austrian company Swarovski and was screened in their "Swarovski Crystal Worlds".

Response
In noting Shekhar Kapur was already known for Elizabeth: The Golden Age, toward Passage Quiet Earth wrote that "the photography and the possibilities of the storyline are just way too good to pass up."

References

External links
 

2009 drama films
2009 short films
2009 films
American drama short films
Films scored by A. R. Rahman
Films about sisters
Films directed by Shekhar Kapur
Films shot in Buenos Aires
Swiss drama films
Swiss short films
2000s English-language films
2000s American films